Freddy "Totono" Grisales (born 22 September 1975) is a retired Colombian football midfielder. He retired at the end of 2009. He played his last season with Junior in the Colombian Professional Football league.

Career
Grisales started his career in 1998 with Atlético Nacional where he helped the team to win the Colombian Championship in 1999 (in spite he and his family are Independiente Medellín's fans). In 1999, he joined San Lorenzo in Argentina, but he only played 6 games for the club before returning to Nacional.

In 2001 Grisales was part of the Colombia squad that won the Copa América 2001.

He had his first play with Colón de Santa Fe, Argentina in 2004, followed by spells with Barcelona SC (Ecuador) and Independiente Medellín (Colombia) before rejoining Colón in 2006.

During his time at Independiente in Argentina, Grisales suffered through a series of injuries and personal problems that prevented him from playing regularly and in 2009 he returned to Colombia to play for Envigado Fútbol Club.

In 2011, Grisales returned to play for Deportivo Pereira.

International goals
Colombia score listed first, score column indicates score after each Grisales goal.

Titles

External links
 Argentine Primera statistics at Fútbol XXI  
 
 Grisales returns to play for Deportivo Pereira at Caracol TV

1975 births
Living people
Footballers from Medellín
Colombian footballers
Association football midfielders
Atlético Nacional footballers
San Lorenzo de Almagro footballers
Independiente Medellín footballers
Barcelona S.C. footballers
Club Atlético Colón footballers
Envigado F.C. players
Club Atlético Independiente footballers
Atlético Junior footballers
Deportivo Pereira footballers
Colombian expatriate footballers
Expatriate footballers in Argentina
Expatriate footballers in Ecuador
Categoría Primera A players
Argentine Primera División players
Colombia international footballers
1999 Copa América players
2001 Copa América players
Copa América-winning players